A plywood saw is a saw that has a fine-toothed blade that minimizes tearing of the outer plies of a sheet of plywood. An extra set of teeth on the curved upper edge of the blade allows starting of a cut on the inside of a panel (away from the edge) without having to drill a starting hole. The standard plywood saw blade is 11 inches long and has 14 tpi (teeth per inch).

References

Sources
 "Reader's Digest Book of Skills and Tools"

Saws
Woodworking hand tools